{{DISPLAYTITLE:C10H16N2O8}}
The molecular formula C10H16N2O8 (molar mass: 292.24 g/mol, exact mass: 292.0907 u) may refer to:

 EDDS
 Ethylenediaminetetraacetic acid